Syzygium tahanense is a species of plant in the family Myrtaceae. It is a tree endemic to Peninsular Malaysia. Some populations are protected in Taman Negara.

References

tahanense
Endemic flora of Peninsular Malaysia
Trees of Peninsular Malaysia
Conservation dependent plants
Taxonomy articles created by Polbot
Taxobox binomials not recognized by IUCN